Inosine pranobex (BAN; also known as inosine acedoben dimepranol (INN) or methisoprinol) is an antiviral drug that is a combination of inosine and dimepranol acedoben (a salt of acetamidobenzoic acid and dimethylaminoisopropanol) in a ratio of 1 to 3.  Inosine pranobex has no effect on viral particles itself.  Instead, it acts as an immunostimulant, an analog of thymus hormones.

Inosine pranobex has been used in SSPE, herpes simplex virus, human papillomavirus, HIV, influenza virus, and airway virus infections, cytomegalovirus, and Epstein-Barr virus infections. The effect on SSPE is unclear, it is not a cure for it.

References 

Antiviral drugs